"Blackout" is a promotional single by American rock band Linkin Park. It is the ninth track from their 2010 album, A Thousand Suns. The song was written by the band and produced by co-lead vocalist Mike Shinoda and Rick Rubin.

Despite the lack of metal elements, the song does contain significant amounts of screaming (the choruses comprise solely of it), making for one of the more coarse-sounding songs on A Thousand Suns. It also features Chester Bennington singing on most of the song with Mike Shinoda singing near the end along with Bennington.

Promotion

On August 18, 2010, Linkin Park posted a "Linkin Park TV" episode showing Chester Bennington doing freestyle vocals over the song. The remix by Renholdër was also used in Underworld: Awakening. A live version of the promotional single was used for the B-side of the single "Burning in the Skies" by the band in the same album.

The song was debuted for the live, alongside the single "Burning in the Skies", in Australia in late 2010. It featured sampled vocals from Bennington, for the bridge. The song was played in many concerts for the A Thousand Suns World Tour and in some concerts for the promotion of Living Things. The opening instrumental of the song was also performed as a segue into Papercut during The Hunting Party and the Carnivores Tour.

"Blackout" was a part of the "Linkin Park Track Pack" downloadable content for the video game Guitar Hero: Warriors of Rock. The song was also used in EA Sports's FIFA 11.

Personnel
 Chester Bennington – lead vocals, percussion
 Mike Shinoda – keyboards, vocals, piano, sampler
 Brad Delson – guitar, percussion, synthesizer
 Phoenix – bass guitar, keyboard, backing vocals
 Joe Hahn – turntables, sampler, backing vocals, programming
 Rob Bourdon – drums, percussion

Charts

Release history

References

2010 songs
Linkin Park songs
Song recordings produced by Rick Rubin
Songs written by Mike Shinoda
Industrial rock songs
American hard rock songs
Electronic rock songs